This article is a comparison of notable software applications that can access or manipulate disk image files. It compares their disk image handling features.

The comparison

See also 
 Disk image
 Disk partitioning
 Optical disc authoring
 List of optical disc authoring software
 Comparison of disc authoring software
 Comparison of disk cloning software

References 

Disk images
Disc image software